Yulbars Khan ((يولبارس خان), 'Tiger';  or ; 13 August 1889 – 27 July 1971), courtesy name Jingfu (景福), was a Uyghur chieftain and Kuomintang general during the Chinese Civil War. He entered the service in the Kumul Khanate of Muhammad Khan of Kumul and later his son Maksud Shah. He served as an advisor at the court, until when Maksud died in March 1930, governor Jin Shuren abolished the khanate. Yulbars then conspired with Khoja Niyaz and Ma Zhongying to overthrow Jin in the Kumul Rebellion. According to some people, Ma restrained Yulbars from traveling to Nanking to ask the Kuomintang for help, Ma earlier had an agreement with the Kuomintang that if he seized Xinjiang, he would be recognized by the Kuomintang as its leader.

Jin was eventually ousted by Sheng Shicai on April 12, 1933, who seized control of the province during 1934–1937. On June 4, 1933 Khoja Niyaz concluded Peace Agreement with Sheng Shicai in Jimsar under mediation of newly appointed Soviet Consul-General in Urumchi Garegin Apressof, close associate of Joseph Stalin, and agreed to turn his Uyghur forces against general Ma Chung-ying in exchange for granting control over Southern Xinjiang (Kashgaria or Tarim Basin), which already was lost by Chinese and where bloody struggle for power between different rebel forces was being developed, also over Turpan Basin and Kumul Region, which currently were occupied by Ma Chung-ying forces.

All territory south of Tengritagh Mountains was granted the " autonomous status " inside of Xinjiang Province, Chinese promised in Agreement not to cross Tengritagh. Yulbars Khan not followed Khoja Niyaz in this decision and remained to be ally of Ma Chung-ying, who appointed him to be the Chief of Procurement Department of Kuomintang (KMT) 36th Division. In summer 1934, after retreating of Ma to the Southern Xinjiang and his following interning on Soviet territory on July 7, 1934, Yulbars Khan managed to conclude peace agreement with Sheng Shicai and was left as commander of Uyghur regiment in Kumul and also given high post of Commissioner for Reconstruction Affairs in Xinjiang Provincial Government. In May 1937, after 6th Uyghur Division and 36th Tungan Division mutinied against Xinjiang Provincial Government in Southern Xinjiang, rebels in Kashgaria appealed to Yulbars Khan to cut off communications between Xinjiang and China from his base in Kumul. During suppression of rebellion by Sheng Shicai with Soviet military support (which included 5,000 Soviet intervention troops, airplanes and tanks BT-7) in summer 1937 he fled to Nanjing and returned to Kumul in 1946.

He led Chinese Muslim cavalry and White Russians against People's Liberation Army (PLA) forces taking over Xinjiang in 1949. He fought at the Battle of Yiwu. In 1951, after most of his troops deserted, he fled to Calcutta in India via Tibet, where his men were attacked by the Dalai Lama's forces. He then took a steamer to Taiwan. The KMT government then appointed him Governor of Xinjiang, which he held until he died in 1971 in Taiwan. In 1969, his memoirs were released.

Yulbars Khan was declared a traitor by Uyghur figures in the East Turkestan Independence Movement like Muhammad Amin Bughra and Isa Yusuf Alptekin for siding with Chiang Kai-shek and the Kuomintang, who continued to claim Xinjiang as a part of the Republic of China.

References

External links
The Soviets in Xinjiang (1911–1949) by Mark Dickens

20th century in Xinjiang
1880s births
1971 deaths
Uyghurs
People from Kashgar
Chinese Muslims
Chinese Muslim generals
National Revolutionary Army generals from Xinjiang
Chinese Nationalist military figures
Kuomintang politicians in Taiwan
Republic of China politicians from Xinjiang
Taiwanese people from Xinjiang
Taiwanese people of Uyghur descent
Taiwanese Muslims
Chinese anti-communists
Chinese Civil War refugees